The 2017–18 Hannover 96 season was the 122nd season in the football club's history and 29th overall season in the top flight of German football, the Bundesliga, having been promoted from the 2. Bundesliga in 2017. Hannover 96 also participated in this season's edition of the domestic cup, the DFB-Pokal. This was the 59th season for Hannover in the HDI-Arena, located in Hanover, Lower Saxony, Germany. The season covered a period from 1 July 2017 to 30 June 2018.

Players

Squad information

Out on loan

Transfers

In

Out

Friendly matches

Competitions

Overview

Bundesliga

League table

Results summary

Results by round

Matches

DFB-Pokal

Statistics

Appearances and goals

|}

Goalscorers

Clean sheets

Disciplinary record

References

Hannover 96 seasons
Hannover 96